Tatyana Eduardovna Kravchenko (born 9 December 1953, Stalino (since 1961 —  Donetsk), Ukrainian SSR, USSR) is a Soviet and Russian film and stage actress, People's Artist of Russia (2002).

Biography 
She was born in the city of Stalino (Ukrainian SSR). In 1970 she graduated from high school №20 of Donetsk.

In 1976 she graduated from the Moscow Art Theatre School (course of Pavel Massalsky and Alla Tarasova).

Since 1976 - the actress of Theatre Lenkom. On admission to the theater Oleg Yankovsky advised the actress to perform under another, less common name. She took the name of her great-grandmother, and since then is known as Tatyana Kravchenko.

The popularity of the actress brought her work in many plays and movie roles.

She lives in Moscow, has a daughter, and is unmarried.

Awards and titles 
 Order of Honour (14 January 2014) for her great contribution in the development of national culture and art, and many years of fruitful activity
Honored Artist of the RSFSR (1991)
People's Artist of Russia (2002)

Selected filmography
 Golos (1983) as Nadya
 Vassa (1983) as housemaid
 Dangerous for Your Life! (1985) as Tamara
 Lady Macbeth of the Mtsensk District (1989) as Aksinya
 Sons of Bitches (1990) as  Serafima Mikhailovna Korzukhina
 Promised Heaven (1991) as matron of the old people's home
 White King, Red Queen (1993) as  Irina Tischenko
 Life and Extraordinary Adventures of Private Ivan Chonkin (1994)  as Aphrodite
 Shirli-Myrli (1995) as  Bronislava Rosembaum, geologist
 Don't Play the Fool... (1997) as Zina
 Who If Not Us (1998) as Samokhin's girlfriend 
 Balakirev the Buffoon (2002) as Anisya  Balakireva
 Children of the Arbat (2004) as Sharok's mother
 My Fair Nanny (2006 / 2008) as Klara Karlovna
 Piter FM (2006) as Tatyana Petrovna
 Svaty (2008-2021) as Valentina Petrovna Budko

References

External links
 
 Татьяна Кравченко на сайте Ленкома
 Официальное сообщество

Soviet stage actresses
Soviet film actresses
Russian stage actresses
Russian film actresses
Russian television actresses
1953 births
Living people
People from Donetsk
Recipients of the Order of Honour (Russia)
Honored Artists of the RSFSR
People's Artists of Russia
Moscow Art Theatre School alumni
20th-century Russian women